Nirmal Rani is an Indian politician. She was elected to the Haryana Legislative Assembly from Ganaur in the 2019 Haryana Legislative Assembly election as a member of the Bharatiya Janata Party.

References 

1967 births
Living people
Bharatiya Janata Party politicians from Haryana
Haryana Janhit Congress politicians
Indian National Lok Dal politicians
People from Sonipat district
Haryana MLAs 2019–2024
21st-century Indian women politicians
Women members of the Haryana Legislative Assembly